, son of Kanehira, was a court noble (kugyo) of the Kamakura period. He held the regent position of Kampaku from 1268 to 1273. Fuyuhira was his adopted son.

See also
 Kasuga Gongen Genki E

References
 https://web.archive.org/web/20070927231943/http://nekhet.ddo.jp/people/japan/fstakatukasa.html

1247 births
1313 deaths
Fujiwara clan
Takatsukasa family
People of Kamakura-period Japan